Daqiao Subdistrict is a subdistrict in Zhangshu, Jiangxi province, China. , it has 2 residential communities and 12 villages under its administration.

See also 
 List of township-level divisions of Jiangxi

References 

Township-level divisions of Jiangxi
Zhangshu